Val-des-Lacs (meaning "Valley of Lakes") is a municipality in the Laurentides region of Quebec, Canada, part of the Les Laurentides Regional County Municipality.

Demographics
Population trend:
 Population in 2011: 721 (2006 to 2011 population change: -7.3%)
 Population in 2006: 778
 Population in 2001: 685
 Population in 1996: 627
 Population in 1991: 495

Private dwellings occupied by usual residents: 349 (total dwellings: 805)

Mother tongue:
 English as first language: 9%
 French as first language: 89.7%
 English and French as first language: 0%
 Other as first language: 1.3%

Education

Sainte Agathe Academy (of the Sir Wilfrid Laurier School Board) in Sainte-Agathe-des-Monts serves English-speaking students in this community for both elementary and secondary levels.

References

External links
 

Incorporated places in Laurentides
Municipalities in Quebec